United Nations Security Council Resolution 1669, adopted unanimously on April 10, 2006, after recalling previous resolutions concerning the situation in Burundi and the Democratic Republic of the Congo, particularly Resolution 1650 (2005), the Council authorised the redeployment of personnel from the United Nations Operation in Burundi (ONUB) to the United Nations Mission in the Democratic Republic of the Congo (MONUC) until July 1, 2006.

Resolution

Observations
The preamble of the resolution reaffirmed the sovereignty, territorial integrity and independence of Burundi and the principles of good-neighbourliness, non-interference and co-operation in the African Great Lakes region. Furthermore, it welcomed the conclusion of the transitional period in Burundi and the installation of a democratic and representative government and institutions. Council members, however, recognised that "factors of instability" remained in the region that could constitute a threat to international peace and security.

Acts
Acting under Chapter VII of the United Nations Charter, the Council redeployed 50 military observers, a military battalion and a military hospital from ONUB to MONUC, with the intention of further renewals dependent on whether the Council authorised extensions of the peacekeeping operations' respective mandates.

See also
 Burundi Civil War
 Kivu conflict
 Ituri conflict
 List of United Nations Security Council Resolutions 1601 to 1700 (2005–2006)
 Second Congo War

References

External links
 
Text of the Resolution at undocs.org

 1669
2006 in the Democratic Republic of the Congo
2006 in Burundi
 1669
 1669
April 2006 events